Holloman is a surname. Notable people with the surname include:

Bill Holloman (born  1956), American saxophonist and trumpet player
Bobo Holloman (1923–1987), American baseball player
Christer Holloman, British writer
DeVonte Holloman (born 1991), American football player
George V. Holloman (1902–1946), American aviator
Laurel Holloman (born 1971), American painter and actress
Michaé Holloman (born 1981), American beauty pageant winner
Robert Lee Holloman (1953–2007), American politician